Rumph may refer to:

People 
Alice Rumph (1878–1978), American painter
Chris Rumph (born 1971), American football coach
Chris Rumph II (born 1998), American football player
Mike Rumph (born 1979), American football player
Rumph., taxonomic author abbreviation of Georg Eberhard Rumphius (1627–1702), German-born botanist

Places 
Rumph House, a historic house in Camden, Arkansas
Rumph Mortuary, a historic commercial building in El Dorado, Arkansas